Crutchfield is a surname of English origin, derived from a place-name that refers to a field containing a burial mound: Celtic cruc (burial mound; cf. Welsh crug) + Anglo-Saxon feld (field).

Notable people named Crutchfield include:

Allison Crutchfield (active 2007–2016), US musician, twin sister of Katie Crutchfield
Buddy Crutchfield (born 1976), US football player
E. Bryant Crutchfield (active late 1970s), Trapper Keeper inventor 
David Crutchfield (1965–2002), Australian Rules football player
Dwayne Crutchfield (born 1959), US American football player
Finis Alonzo Crutchfield Jr. (1916–1987), US Methodist bishop
James Crutchfield (1912–2001), US singer, pianist & songwriter
James A. Crutchfield, US writer, 2011 Owen Wister Award winner
James P. Crutchfield (born 1955), US mathematician & physicist
Jan Crutchfield (1938–2012), US songwriter
Jimmie Crutchfield (1910–1933), US professional Negro leagues baseball player
Jerry Crutchfield (1934-2022), US country & pop record producer, songwriter & musician
Johnnie Crutchfield (born 1947), US politician in Oklahoma 
Katie Crutchfield (active 2007–2020), US musician, twin sister of Allison Crutchfield
Les Crutchfield (1916–1966), US screenwriter known for Escape (radio program)
Michael Crutchfield (born 1961), Australian politician of Victorian Legislative Assembly
Nels Crutchfield (1911–1985), Canadian professional hockey player
Robin Crutchfield (born 1952), US artist
Shireen Crutchfield (born 1970), US actress
Stapleton Crutchfield (1835–1865), Virginian officer in Confederate States army during US Civil War
Thomas Crutchfield, mayor of Chattanooga, Tennessee, USA in 1849
Ward Crutchfield (1928–2016, US politician of Tennessee Senate
Will Crutchfield (born 1957), US conductor, musicologist
William Crutchfield (1824–90), US politician
Linda Crutchfield-Bocock (born 1942), Canadian skier & luge

References

Surnames
English-language surnames
Surnames of English origin
Surnames of British Isles origin